Megalodon (Otodus megalodon), meaning "big tooth", is an extinct species of mackerel shark that lived approximately 23 to 3.6 million years ago (Mya), from the Early Miocene to the Pliocene epochs. It was formerly thought to be a member of the family Lamnidae and a close relative of the great white shark (Carcharodon carcharias). However, it is now classified into the extinct family Otodontidae, which diverged from the great white shark during the Early Cretaceous.

While regarded as one of the largest and most powerful predators to have ever lived, the megalodon is only known from fragmentary remains, and its appearance and maximum size are uncertain. Scientists differ on whether it would have more closely resembled a stockier version of the great white shark, the whale shark (Rhincodon typus), the basking shark (Cetorhinus maximus) or the sand tiger shark (Carcharias taurus).

Megalodon probably had a major impact on the structure of marine communities. The fossil record indicates that it had a cosmopolitan distribution. It probably targeted large prey, such as whales, seals and sea turtles. Juveniles inhabited warm coastal waters and fed on fish and small whales. Unlike the great white, which attacks prey from the soft underside, megalodon probably used its strong jaws to break through the chest cavity and puncture the heart and lungs of its prey.

The animal faced competition from whale-eating cetaceans, such as Livyatan and other macroraptorial sperm whales and possibly smaller ancestral killer whales. As the shark preferred warmer waters, it is thought that oceanic cooling associated with the onset of the ice ages, coupled with the lowering of sea levels and resulting loss of suitable nursery areas, may have also contributed to its decline. A reduction in the diversity of baleen whales and a shift in their distribution toward polar regions may have reduced megalodon's primary food source. The shark's extinction coincides with a gigantism trend in baleen whales.

Taxonomy

Naming 

According to Renaissance accounts, gigantic triangular fossil teeth often found embedded in rocky formations were once believed to be the petrified tongues, or glossopetrae, of dragons and snakes. This interpretation was corrected in 1667 by Danish naturalist Nicolas Steno, who recognized them as shark teeth, and famously produced a depiction of a shark's head bearing such teeth. He described his findings in the book The Head of a Shark Dissected, which also contained an illustration of a megalodon tooth.

Swiss naturalist Louis Agassiz gave this shark its initial scientific name, Carcharodon megalodon, in his 1843 work Recherches sur les poissons fossiles, based on tooth remains. English paleontologist Edward Charlesworth in his 1837 paper used the name Carcharias megalodon, while citing Agassiz as the author, indicating that Agassiz described the species prior to 1843. English paleontologist Charles Davies Sherborn in 1928 listed an 1835 series of articles by Agassiz as the first scientific description of the shark. The teeth of megalodon are morphologically similar to those of the great white shark (Carcharodon carcharias), and on the basis of this observation, Agassiz assigned megalodon to the genus Carcharodon.

There was one apparent description of the shark in 1881 classifying it as Selache manzonii.

Evolution 

While the earliest megalodon remains have been reported from the Late Oligocene, around 28 million years ago (Mya), there is disagreement as to when it appeared, with dates ranging to as young as 16 mya. It has been thought that megalodon became extinct around the end of the Pliocene, about 2.6 Mya; claims of Pleistocene megalodon teeth, younger than 2.6 million years old, are considered unreliable. A 2019 assessment moves the extinction date back to earlier in the Pliocene, 3.6 Mya.

Megalodon is now considered to be a member of the family Otodontidae, genus Otodus, as opposed to its previous classification into Lamnidae, genus Carcharodon. Megalodon's classification into Carcharodon was due to dental similarity with the great white shark, but most authors currently believe that this is due to convergent evolution. In this model, the great white shark is more closely related to the extinct broad-toothed mako (Isurus hastalis) than to megalodon, as evidenced by more similar dentition in those two sharks; megalodon teeth have much finer serrations than great white shark teeth. The great white shark is more closely related to the mako shark (Isurus spp.), with a common ancestor around 4 Mya. Proponents of the former model, wherein megalodon and the great white shark are more closely related, argue that the differences between their dentition are minute and obscure.

The genus Carcharocles currently contains four species: C. auriculatus, C. angustidens, C. chubutensis, and C. megalodon. The evolution of this lineage is characterized by the increase of serrations, the widening of the crown, the development of a more triangular shape, and the disappearance of the lateral cusps. The evolution in tooth morphology reflects a shift in predation tactics from a tearing-grasping bite to a cutting bite, likely reflecting a shift in prey choice from fish to cetaceans. Lateral cusplets were finally lost in a gradual process that took roughly 12 million years during the transition between C. chubutensis and C. megalodon. The genus was proposed by D. S. Jordan and H. Hannibal in 1923 to contain C. auriculatus. In the 1980s, megalodon was assigned to Carcharocles. Before this, in 1960, the genus Procarcharodon was erected by French ichthyologist Edgard Casier, which included those four sharks and was considered separate from the great white shark. It is now considered a junior synonym of Carcharocles. The genus Palaeocarcharodon was erected alongside Procarcharodon to represent the beginning of the lineage, and, in the model wherein megalodon and the great white shark are closely related, their last common ancestor. It is believed to be an evolutionary dead-end and unrelated to the Carcharocles sharks by authors who reject that model.

Another model of the evolution of this genus, also proposed by Casier in 1960, is that the direct ancestor of the Carcharocles is the shark Otodus obliquus, which lived from the Paleocene through the Miocene epochs, 60 to 13 Mya. The genus Otodus is ultimately derived from Cretolamna, a shark from the Cretaceous period. In this model, O. obliquus evolved into O. aksuaticus, which evolved into C. auriculatus, and then into C. angustidens, and then into C. chubutensis, and then finally into C. megalodon.

Another model of the evolution of Carcharocles, proposed in 2001 by paleontologist Michael Benton, is that the three other species are actually a single species of shark that gradually changed over time between the Paleocene and the Pliocene, making it a chronospecies. Some authors suggest that C. auriculatus, C. angustidens, and C. chubutensis should be classified as a single species in the genus Otodus, leaving C. megalodon the sole member of Carcharocles.

The genus Carcharocles may be invalid, and the shark may actually belong in the genus Otodus, making it Otodus megalodon. A 1974 study on Paleogene sharks by Henri Cappetta erected the subgenus Megaselachus, classifying the shark as Otodus (Megaselachus) megalodon, along with O. (M.) chubutensis. A 2006 review of Chondrichthyes elevated Megaselachus to genus, and classified the sharks as Megaselachus megalodon and M. chubutensis. The discovery of fossils assigned to the genus Megalolamna in 2016 led to a re-evaluation of Otodus, which concluded that it is paraphyletic, that is, it consists of a last common ancestor but it does not include all of its descendants. The inclusion of the Carcharocles sharks in Otodus would make it monophyletic, with the sister clade being Megalolamna.

The cladogram below represents the hypothetical relationships between megalodon and other sharks, including the great white shark. Modified from Shimada et al. (2016), Ehret et al., (2009), and the findings of Siversson et al. (2013).

Biology

Appearance 

One interpretation on how megalodon appeared was that it was a robust-looking shark, and may have had a similar build to the great white shark. The jaws may have been blunter and wider than the great white, and the fins would have also been similar in shape, though thicker due to its size. It may have had a pig-eyed appearance, in that it had small, deep-set eyes.

Another interpretation is that megalodon bore a similarity to the whale shark (Rhincodon typus) or the basking shark (Cetorhinus maximus). The tail fin would have been crescent-shaped, the anal fin and second dorsal fin would have been small, and there would have been a caudal keel present on either side of the tail fin (on the caudal peduncle). This build is common in other large aquatic animals, such as whales, tuna, and other sharks, in order to reduce drag while swimming. The head shape can vary between species as most of the drag-reducing adaptations are toward the tail-end of the animal.

Since Carcharocles is derived from Otodus, and the two had teeth that bear a close similarity to those of the sand tiger shark (Carcharias taurus), megalodon may have had a build more similar to the sand tiger shark than to other sharks. This is unlikely since the sand tiger shark is a carangiform swimmer which requires faster movement of the tail for propulsion through the water than the great white shark, a thunniform swimmer.

Size 
Due to fragmentary remains, there have been many contradictory size estimates for megalodon, as they can only be drawn from fossil teeth and vertebrae. The great white shark has been the basis of reconstruction and size estimation, as it is regarded as the best analogue to megalodon. Several total length estimation methods have been produced from comparing megalodon teeth and vertebrae to those of the great white.
It is possible that different populations of megalodon around the globe had different body sizes and behaviors due to different ecological pressures. Megalodon is thought to have been the largest macropredatory shark that ever lived.

In his 2015 book, The Story of Life in 25 Fossils: Tales of Intrepid Fossil Hunters and the Wonders of Evolution, Donald Prothero proposed the body mass estimates for different individuals of different length by extrapolating from a vertebral centra based on the dimensions of the great white, a methodology also used for the 2008 study which supports the maximum mass estimate.

An individual of this size would have required 98,175 kcal per day, 20 times more than what the adult great white requires.

Its large size may have been due to climatic factors and the abundance of large prey items, and it may have also been influenced by the evolution of regional endothermy (mesothermy) which would have increased its metabolic rate and swimming speed. The otodontid sharks have been considered to have been ectotherms, so on that basis megalodon would have been ectothermic. However, the largest contemporary ectothermic sharks, such as the whale shark, are filter feeders, while lamnids are now known to be regional endotherms, implying some metabolic correlations with a predatory lifestyle. These considerations, as well as tooth oxygen isotopic data and the need for higher burst swimming speeds in macropredators of endothermic prey than ectothermy would allow, imply that otodontids, including megalodon, were probably regional endotherms.

In 2020, Shimada and colleagues suggested large size was instead due to intrauterine cannibalism, where the larger fetus eats the smaller fetus, resulting in progressively larger and larger fetuses, requiring the mother to attain even greater size as well as caloric requirements which would have promoted endothermy. Males would have needed to keep up with female size in order to still effectively copulate (which probably involved latching onto the female with claspers, like modern cartilaginous fish).

Maximum estimates 
The first attempt to reconstruct the jaw of megalodon was made by Bashford Dean in 1909, displayed at the American Museum of Natural History. From the dimensions of this jaw reconstruction, it was hypothesized that megalodon could have approached  in length. Dean had overestimated the size of the cartilage on both jaws, causing it to be too tall.

However, tooth enamel height does not necessarily increase in proportion to the animal's total length.

In 1996, shark researchers Michael D. Gottfried, Leonard Compagno, and S. Curtis Bowman proposed a linear relationship between the great white shark's total length and the height of the largest upper anterior tooth. The proposed relationship is: total length in meters = − (0.096) × [UA maximum height (mm)]-(0.22). They also compared the ratio between the tooth height and total length of large female great whites to the largest megalodon tooth.

In 2002, shark researcher Clifford Jeremiah proposed that total length was proportional to the root width of an upper anterior tooth. Jeremiah pointed out that the jaw perimeter of a shark is directly proportional to its total length, with the width of the roots of the largest teeth being a tool for estimating jaw perimeter.

In 2002, paleontologist Kenshu Shimada of DePaul University proposed a linear relationship between tooth crown height and total length after conducting anatomical analysis of several specimens, allowing any sized tooth to be used. Shimada stated that the previously proposed methods were based on a less-reliable evaluation of the dental homology between megalodon and the great white shark, and that the growth rate between the crown and root is not isometric, which he considered in his model. Among several specimens found in the Gatún Formation of Panama, one upper lateral tooth was used by other researchers to obtain a total length estimate of  using this method.

In 2019, Shimada revisited the size of megalodon and discouraged using non-anterior teeth for estimations, noting that the exact position of isolated non-anterior teeth is difficult to identify. Shimada provided maximum total length estimates using the largest anterior teeth available in museums. However, Shimada remeasured the tooth and found it actually to measure .

In 2021, Victor J. Perez, Ronny M. Leder, and Teddy Badaut proposed a method of estimating total length of megalodon from the sum of the tooth crown widths. Using more complete megalodon dentitions, they reconstructed the dental formula and then made comparisons to living sharks. The researchers noted that the 2002 Shimada crown height equations produce wildly varying results for different teeth belonging to the same shark (range of error of ± ), casting doubt on some of the conclusions of previous studies using that method. This maximum length estimate was also supported by Cooper and his colleagues in 2022.

There are anecdotal reports of teeth larger than those found in museum collections.

Teeth and bite force 

The most common fossils of megalodon are its teeth. Diagnostic characteristics include a triangular shape, robust structure, large size, fine serrations, a lack of lateral denticles, and a visible V-shaped neck (where the root meets the crown). The tooth met the jaw at a steep angle, similar to the great white shark. The tooth was anchored by connective tissue fibers, and the roughness of the base may have added to mechanical strength. The lingual side of the tooth, the part facing the tongue, was convex; and the labial side, the other side of the tooth, was slightly convex or flat. The anterior teeth were almost perpendicular to the jaw and symmetrical, whereas the posterior teeth were slanted and asymmetrical.

In 1989, a nearly complete set of megalodon teeth was discovered in Saitama, Japan. Another nearly complete associated megalodon dentition was excavated from the Yorktown Formations in the United States, and served as the basis of a jaw reconstruction of megalodon at the National Museum of Natural History (USNM). Based on these discoveries, an artificial dental formula was put together for megalodon in 1996.

The dental formula of megalodon is: . As evident from the formula, megalodon had four kinds of teeth in its jaws: anterior, intermediate, lateral, and posterior. Megalodon's intermediate tooth technically appears to be an upper anterior and is termed as "A3" because it is fairly symmetrical and does not point mesially (side of the tooth toward the midline of the jaws where the left and right jaws meet). Megalodon had a very robust dentition, and had over 250 teeth in its jaws, spanning 5 rows. The teeth were also serrated, which would have improved efficiency in cutting through flesh or bone. The shark may have been able to open its mouth to a 75° angle, though a reconstruction at the USNM approximates a 100° angle.

In addition, Wroe and colleagues pointed out that sharks shake sideways while feeding, amplifying the force generated, which would probably have caused the total force experienced by prey to be higher than the estimate.

In 2021, Antonio Ballell and Humberto Ferrón used Finite Element Analysis modeling to examine the stress distribution of three types of megalodon teeth and closely related mega-toothed species when exposed to anterior and lateral forces, the latter of which would be generated when a shark shakes its head to tear through flesh. The resulting simulations identified higher levels of stress in megalodon teeth under lateral force loads compared to its precursor species such as O. obliquus and O. angusteidens when tooth size was removed as a factor. This suggests that megalodon teeth were of a different functional significance than previously expected, challenging prior interpretations that megalodon's dental morphology was primarily driven by a dietary shift towards marine mammals. Instead, the authors proposed that it was a byproduct of an increase in body size caused by heterochronic selection.

Internal anatomy 

Megalodon is represented in the fossil record by teeth, vertebral centra, and coprolites. As with all sharks, the skeleton of megalodon was formed of cartilage rather than bone; consequently most fossil specimens are poorly preserved. To support its large dentition, the jaws of megalodon would have been more massive, stouter, and more strongly developed than those of the great white, which possesses a comparatively gracile dentition. Its chondrocranium, the cartilaginous skull, would have had a blockier and more robust appearance than that of the great white. Its fins were proportional to its larger size.

Some fossil vertebrae have been found. The most notable example is a partially preserved vertebral column of a single specimen, excavated in the Antwerp Basin, Belgium, in 1926. The shark's vertebrae may have gotten much bigger, and scrutiny of the specimen revealed that it had a higher vertebral count than specimens of any known shark, possibly over 200 centra; only the great white approached it.

The coprolite remains of megalodon are spiral-shaped, indicating that the shark may have had a spiral valve, a corkscrew-shaped portion of the lower intestines, similar to extant lamniform sharks.

Gottfried and colleagues reconstructed the entire skeleton of megalodon, which was later put on display at the Calvert Marine Museum in the United States and the Iziko South African Museum.

Paleobiology

Range and habitat 
Megalodon had a cosmopolitan distribution; its fossils have been excavated from many parts of the world, including Europe, Africa, the Americas, and Australia. It most commonly occurred in subtropical to temperate latitudes. It arguably had the capacity to endure such low temperatures due to mesothermy, the physiological capability of large sharks to maintain a higher body temperature than the surrounding water by conserving metabolic heat.

Megalodon inhabited a wide range of marine environments (i.e., shallow coastal waters, areas of coastal upwelling, swampy coastal lagoons, sandy littorals, and offshore deep water environments), and exhibited a transient lifestyle. Adult megalodon were not abundant in shallow water environments, and mostly inhabited offshore areas. Megalodon may have moved between coastal and oceanic waters, particularly in different stages of its life cycle.

They do not suggest any trend of changing body size with absolute latitude, or of change in size over time (although the Carcharocles lineage in general is thought to display a trend of increasing size over time).

Locations of fossils 
Megalodon had a global distribution and fossils of the shark have been found in many places around the world, bordering all oceans of the Neogene.

Prey relationships 

Though sharks are generally opportunistic feeders, megalodon's great size, high-speed swimming capability, and powerful jaws, coupled with an impressive feeding apparatus, made it an apex predator capable of consuming a broad spectrum of animals. Otodus megalodon was probably one of the most powerful predators to have existed. A study focusing on calcium isotopes of extinct and extant elasmobranch sharks and rays revealed that megalodon fed at a higher trophic level than the contemporaneous great white shark ("higher up" in the food chain.)

Fossil evidence indicates that megalodon preyed upon many cetacean species, such as dolphins, small whales, cetotheres, squalodontids (shark toothed dolphins), sperm whales, bowhead whales, and rorquals. In addition to this, they also targeted seals, sirenians, and sea turtles. The shark was an opportunist and piscivorous, and it would have also gone after smaller fish and other sharks. Many whale bones have been found with deep gashes most likely made by their teeth. Various excavations have revealed megalodon teeth lying close to the chewed remains of whales, and sometimes in direct association with them.

The feeding ecology of megalodon appears to have varied with age and between sites, like the modern great white shark. It is plausible that the adult megalodon population off the coast of Peru targeted primarily cetothere whales  in length and other prey smaller than itself, rather than large whales in the same size class as themselves. Meanwhile, juveniles likely had a diet that consisted more of fish.

Competition 

Megalodon faced a highly competitive environment. Its position at the top of the food chain probably had a significant impact on the structuring of marine communities. Fossil evidence indicates a correlation between megalodon and the emergence and diversification of cetaceans and other marine mammals. Juvenile megalodon preferred habitats where small cetaceans were abundant, and adult megalodon preferred habitats where large cetaceans were abundant. Such preferences may have developed shortly after they appeared in the Oligocene.

Megalodon were contemporaneous with whale-eating toothed whales (particularly macroraptorial sperm whales and squalodontidae), which were also probably among the era's apex predators, and provided competition. Fossilized teeth of an undetermined species of such physeteroids from Lee Creek Mine, North Carolina, indicate it had a maximum body length of 8–10 m and a maximum lifespan of about 25 years. This is very different from similarly sized modern killer whales that live to 65 years, suggesting that unlike the latter, which are apex predators, these physeteroids were subject to predation from larger species such as megalodon or Livyatan. By the Late Miocene, around 11 Mya, macroraptorials experienced a significant decline in abundance and diversity. Other species may have filled this niche in the Pliocene, such as the fossil killer whale Orcinus citoniensis which may have been a pack predator and targeted prey larger than itself, but this inference is disputed, and it was probably a generalist predator rather than a marine mammal specialist.

Megalodon may have subjected contemporaneous white sharks to competitive exclusion, as the fossil records indicate that other shark species avoided regions it inhabited by mainly keeping to the colder waters of the time. In areas where their ranges seemed to have overlapped, such as in Pliocene Baja California, it is possible that megalodon and the great white shark occupied the area at different times of the year while following different migratory prey. Megalodon probably also had a tendency for cannibalism, much like contemporary sharks.

Feeding strategies 

Sharks often employ complex hunting strategies to engage large prey animals. Great white shark hunting strategies may be similar to how megalodon hunted its large prey. Megalodon bite marks on whale fossils suggest that it employed different hunting strategies against large prey than the great white shark.

Unlike great whites which target the underbelly of their prey, megalodon probably targeted the heart and lungs, with their thick teeth adapted for biting through tough bone, as indicated by bite marks inflicted to the rib cage and other tough bony areas on whale remains. Furthermore, attack patterns could differ for prey of different sizes. Fossil remains of some small cetaceans, for example cetotheres, suggest that they were rammed with great force from below before being killed and eaten, based on compression fractures.

There is also evidence that a possible separate hunting strategy existed for attacking raptorial sperm whales; a tooth belonging to an undetermined  physeteroid closely resembling those of Acrophyseter discovered in the Nutrien Aurora Phosphate Mine in North Carolina suggests that a megalodon or O. chubutensis may have aimed for the head of the sperm whale in order to inflict a fatal bite, the resulting attack leaving distinctive bite marks on the tooth. While scavenging behavior cannot be ruled out as a possibility, the placement of the bite marks is more consistent with predatory attacks than feeding by scavenging, as the jaw is not a particularly nutritious area to for a shark feed or focus on. The fact that the bite marks were found on the tooth's roots further suggest that the shark broke the whale's jaw during the bite, suggesting the bite was extremely powerful. The fossil is also notable as it stands as the first known instance of an antagonistic interaction between a sperm whale and an otodontid shark recorded in the fossil record.

During the Pliocene, larger cetaceans appeared. Megalodon apparently further refined its hunting strategies to cope with these large whales. Numerous fossilized flipper bones and tail vertebrae of large whales from the Pliocene have been found with megalodon bite marks, which suggests that megalodon would immobilize a large whale before killing and feeding on it.

Growth and reproduction 

In 2010, Ehret estimated that megalodon had a fast growth rate nearly two times that of the extant great white shark. He also estimated that the slowing or cessation of somatic growth in megalodon occurred around 25 years of age, suggesting that this species had an extremely delayed sexual maturity. In 2021, Shimada and colleagues calculated the growth rate of an approximately  individual based on the Belgian vertebrate column specimen that presumably contains annual growth rings on three of its vertebrae. For a  individual—which they considered to have been the maximum size attainable—this would equate to a lifespan of 88 to 100 years.

Megalodon, like contemporaneous sharks, made use of nursery areas to birth their young in, specifically warm-water coastal environments with large amounts of food and protection from predators. Nursery sites were identified in the Gatún Formation of Panama, the Calvert Formation of Maryland, Banco de Concepción in the Canary Islands, and the Bone Valley Formation of Florida. Given that all extant lamniform sharks give birth to live young, this is believed to have been true of megalodon also. Their dietary preferences display an ontogenetic shift: Young megalodon commonly preyed on fish, sea turtles, dugongs, and small cetaceans; mature megalodon moved to off-shore areas and consumed large cetaceans.

An exceptional case in the fossil record suggests that juvenile megalodon may have occasionally attacked much larger balaenopterid whales.

Extinction

Climate change 
The Earth experienced a number of changes during the time period megalodon existed which affected marine life. A cooling trend starting in the Oligocene 35 Mya ultimately led to glaciation at the poles. Geological events changed currents and precipitation; among these were the closure of the Central American Seaway and changes in the Tethys Ocean, contributing to the cooling of the oceans. The stalling of the Gulf Stream prevented nutrient-rich water from reaching major marine ecosystems, which may have negatively affected its food sources. The largest fluctuation of sea levels in the Cenozoic era occurred in the Plio-Pleistocene, between around 5 million to 12 thousand years ago, due to the expansion of glaciers at the poles, which negatively impacted coastal environments, and may have contributed to its extinction along with those of several other marine megafaunal species. These oceanographic changes, in particular the sea level drops, may have restricted many of the suitable shallow warm-water nursery sites for megalodon, hindering reproduction. Nursery areas are pivotal for the survival of many shark species, in part because they protect juveniles from predation.

As its range did not apparently extend into colder waters, megalodon may not have been able to retain a significant amount of metabolic heat, so its range was restricted to shrinking warmer waters. Fossil evidence confirms the absence of megalodon in regions around the world where water temperatures had significantly declined during the Pliocene. However, an analysis of the distribution of megalodon over time suggests that temperature change did not play a direct role in its extinction. Its distribution during the Miocene and Pliocene did not correlate with warming and cooling trends; while abundance and distribution declined during the Pliocene, megalodon did show a capacity to inhabit colder latitudes. This is consistent with evidence that it was a mesotherm.

Changing ecosystem 

Marine mammals attained their greatest diversity during the Miocene, such as with baleen whales with over 20 recognized Miocene genera in comparison to only six extant genera. Such diversity presented an ideal setting to support a super-predator such as megalodon. By the end of the Miocene, many species of mysticetes had gone extinct; surviving species may have been faster swimmers and thus more elusive prey. Furthermore, after the closure of the Central American Seaway, tropical whales decreased in diversity and abundance. The extinction of megalodon correlates with the decline of many small mysticete lineages, and it is possible that it was quite dependent on them as a food source. Additionally, a marine megafauna extinction during the Pliocene was discovered to have eliminated 36% of all large marine species including 55% of marine mammals, 35% of seabirds, 9% of sharks, and 43% of sea turtles. The extinction was selective for endotherms and mesotherms relative to poikilotherms, implying causation by a decreased food supply and thus consistent with megalodon being mesothermic. Megalodon may have been too large to sustain itself on the declining marine food resources. The cooling of the oceans during the Pliocene might have restricted the access of megalodon to the polar regions, depriving it of the large whales which had migrated there.

Competition from large odontocetes, such as macropredatory sperm whales which appeared in the Miocene, and a member of genus Orcinus (i.e., Orcinus citoniensis) in the Pliocene, is assumed to have contributed to the decline and extinction of megalodon. But this assumption is disputed: The Orcininae emerged in Mid-Pliocene with O. citoniensis reported from the
Pliocene of Italy, and similar forms reported from the Pliocene of England and South Africa, indicating the capacity of these dolphins to cope with increasingly prevalent cold water temperatures in high latitudes. These dolphins were assumed to have been macrophagous in some studies, but on closer inspection, these dolphins are not found to be macrophagous and fed on small fishes instead. On the other hand, gigantic macropredatory sperm whales such as Livyatan-like forms are last reported from Australia and South Africa circa 5 million years ago. Others, such as Hoplocetus and Scaldicetus also occupied a niche similar to that of modern killer whales but the last of these forms disappeared during the Pliocene. Members of genus Orcinus became large and macrophagous in the Pleistocene.

Paleontologist Robert Boessenecker and his colleagues rechecked the fossil record of megalodon for carbon dating errors and concluded that it disappeared circa 3.5 million years ago. Boessenecker and his colleagues further suggest that megalodon suffered range fragmentation due to climatic shifts, and competition with white sharks might have contributed to its decline and extinction. Competition with white sharks is assumed to be a factor in other studies as well, but this hypothesis warrants further testing. Multiple compounding environmental and ecological factors including climate change and thermal limitations, collapse of prey populations and resource competition with white sharks are believed to have contributed to decline and extinction of megalodon for now.

The extinction of megalodon set the stage for further changes in marine communities. The average body size of baleen whales increased significantly after its disappearance, although possibly due to other, climate-related, causes. Conversely the increase in baleen whale size may have contributed to the extinction of megalodon, as they may have preferred to go after smaller whales; bite marks on large whale species may have come from scavenging sharks. Megalodon may have simply become coextinct with smaller whale species, such as Piscobalaena nana. The extinction of megalodon had a positive impact on other apex predators of the time, such as the great white shark, in some cases spreading to regions where megalodon became absent.

In popular culture 

Megalodon has been portrayed in many works of fiction, including films and novels, and continues to be a popular subject for fiction involving sea monsters. These claims are now discredited, and are probably teeth that were well-preserved by a thick mineral-crust precipitate of manganese dioxide, and so had a lower decomposition rate and retained a white color during fossilization. Fossil megalodon teeth can vary in color from off-white to dark browns, greys, and blues, and some fossil teeth may have been redeposited into a younger stratum. The claims that megalodon could remain elusive in the depths, similar to the megamouth shark which was discovered in 1976, are unlikely as the shark lived in warm coastal waters and probably could not survive in the cold and nutrient-poor deep sea environment.

Contemporary fiction about megalodon surviving into modern times was pioneered by the 1997 novel Meg: A Novel of Deep Terror by Steve Alten and its subsequent sequels. Megalodon subsequently began to feature in films, such as the 2003 direct to video Shark Attack 3: Megalodon, and later The Meg, a 2018 film based on the 1997 book which grossed over $500 million at the box office.

Animal Planet's pseudo-documentary Mermaids: The Body Found included an encounter 1.6 mya between a pod of mermaids and a megalodon. Later, in August 2013, the Discovery Channel opened its annual Shark Week series with another film for television, Megalodon: The Monster Shark Lives, a controversial docufiction about the creature that presented alleged evidence in order to suggest that megalodons still lived. This program received criticism for being completely fictional and for inadequately disclosing its fictional nature; for example, all of the supposed scientists depicted were paid actors, and there was no disclosure in the documentary itself that it was fictional. In a poll by Discovery, 73% of the viewers of the documentary thought that megalodon was not extinct. In 2014, Discovery re-aired The Monster Shark Lives, along with a new one-hour program, Megalodon: The New Evidence, and an additional fictionalized program entitled Shark of Darkness: Wrath of Submarine, resulting in further backlash from media sources and the scientific community. Despite the criticism from scientists, Megalodon: The Monster Shark Lives was a huge ratings success, gaining 4.8 million viewers, the most for any Shark Week episode up to that point.

Megalodon teeth are the state fossil of North Carolina.

See also 

 List of prehistoric cartilaginous fish
 Prehistoric fish
 Largest prehistoric organisms

Notes

References

Further reading

External links 

 The rise of super predatory sharks
 Carcharocles: Extinct Megatoothed shark

Paleontological videos
 
  with comments on its extinction.
 
  (featuring expert Dana Ehret)
  (featuring expert Mikael Siverson)
  (featuring expert Bretton Kent)

Carcharocles
Miocene sharks
Pliocene sharks
Miocene first appearances
Piacenzian extinctions
Pisco Formation
Fossil taxa described in 1843
Taxa named by Louis Agassiz
Symbols of North Carolina
Apex predators